Slovenia competed at the 2000 Summer Paralympics in Sydney, Australia. 17 competitors from Slovenia won 4 medals, including 2 silver and 2 bronze to finish 55th in the medal table.

Medallists

See also 
 Slovenia at the Paralympics
 Slovenia at the 2000 Summer Olympics

References 

Slovenia at the Paralympics
2000 in Slovenian sport
Nations at the 2000 Summer Paralympics